A Petticoat Pilot is a lost 1918 American comedy silent film directed by Rollin S. Sturgeon and written by Joseph C. Lincoln and Gardner Hunting. The film stars Vivian Martin, Theodore Roberts, James Neill, Harrison Ford, Bert Hadley and Tom Bates. The film was released on February 4, 1918, by Paramount Pictures.

Plot

Cast
Vivian Martin as Mary-'Gusta
Theodore Roberts as 'Cap'n Shad' Gould
James Neill as Zoeth Hamilton
Harrison Ford as Crawford Smith
Bert Hadley as Edgar Fuller
Tom Bates as Isaiah
Helen Gilmore as Mrs. Hobbs
John Burton as Judge Baxter
Richard Henry Cummings as Rastus Young
Jane Wolfe as Mrs. Young
Cecil Lionel as Mr. Bacheldor
Jane Keckley as Mrs. Bacheldor
Antrim Short as Jimmie Bacheldor
Clarice Urhe as Miss Keith
R.O. Pennell as John Keith
Billy Crary
Elinor Hancock
Jack Lott

References

External links 
 
 

1918 films
1910s English-language films
Silent American comedy films
1918 comedy films
Paramount Pictures films
American black-and-white films
Lost American films
American silent feature films
Films directed by Rollin S. Sturgeon
1918 lost films
Lost comedy films
1910s American films
English-language comedy films